Return of the Bad Men, also known as Return of the Badmen, is a 1948 American Western film directed by Ray Enright and starring Randolph Scott, Robert Ryan and Anne Jeffreys. A loose sequel to the 1946 film Badman's Territory, it was followed by Best of the Badmen (1951). Written by the husband-and-wife team of Jack Natteford and Luci Ward, the film was shot at the RKO Encino Ranch.  It was the final collaboration between Enright and Scott and Jeffreys' final picture for RKO.

Plot
In 1880s Indian Territory (future Oklahoma), a rancher reluctantly agrees to take up the post of federal marshal and tackle a violent gang of outlaws ravaging the territory.

Cast

 Randolph Scott as Vance  
 Robert Ryan as The Sundance Kid  
 Anne Jeffreys as Cheyenne  
 George 'Gabby' Hayes as John Pettit  
 Jacqueline White as Madge Allen  
 Steve Brodie as Cole Younger 
 Tom Keene as Jim Younger
 Robert Bray as John Younger 
 Lex Barker as Emmett Dalton  
 Walter Reed as Bob Dalton  
 Michael Harvey as Grat Dalton  
 Dean White as Billy The Kid / Billy the Kid  
 Robert Armstrong as Wild Bill Doolin  
 Tom Tyler as Wild Bill Yeager  
 Lew Harvey as Arkansas Kid  
 Gary Gray as Johnny  
 Walter Baldwin as Muley Wilson  
 Minna Gombell as Emily  
 Warren Jackson as George Mason  
 Robert Clarke as Dave 
 Jason Robards Sr. as Judge Harper
 Kenneth MacDonald as Colonel Markham 
 John Hamilton as Doc Greene
 Lane Chandler as Posse leader

References

Bibliography
 Jarlett, Franklin. Robert Ryan: A Biography and Critical Filmography. McFarland, 1997.

External links

1948 films
American historical films
American Western (genre) films
American black-and-white films
1940s historical films
1948 Western (genre) films
1940s English-language films
Films directed by Ray Enright
RKO Pictures films
Films set in Oklahoma
Films set in the 1880s
Films scored by Paul Sawtell
1940s American films